Jeffrey Edwards may refer to:

 Jeff Edwards (born 1959), American author of military thrillers
 Jeffery Edwards (born 1945), British artist